Lancashire Aircraft Corporation was a major British charter airline after World War II. Its founding father was Eric Rylands. It played an important role in the Berlin Airlift. It also flew scheduled routes and was important in the development of Coach-air services, leading to the founding of Skyways Coach Air and the start of the Inclusive Tour (IT) industry. Its major subsidiary, Samlesbury Engineering, supported its operations and converted many military aircraft for commercial use, also founding Lancashire Aircraft Company.

History

Foundation

Lancashire Aircraft Corporation (LAC) was formed at Samlesbury Aerodrome near Blackburn, Lancashire, during World War II, along with a subsidiary, Samlesbury Engineering Ltd. The headquarters were in Berkeley Street, London W1. One of the founders was John Eric Rylands, (born 29 June 1909), who was destined to become a major influence on the British airline industry, alongside Harold Bamberg of British Eagle and Freddie Laker.

LAC was appointed to the Civilian Repair Organisation, and won business repairing Bristol Beaufighters and Beauforts, in 1944 expanding the Beaufighter work to Blackpool's Stanley Park Aerodrome. Towards the end of the war, activity there also included the parting-out and scrapping of many Hawker Hurricanes and Supermarine Seafires.

In July 1945. two months after the end of WWII, LAC acquired its first aircraft, a De Havilland Rapide based it at Stanley Park, and started doing pleasure flights. The following year it also operated pleasure flights from Yeadon Aerodrome in Yorkshire. These were followed by charter flights, the first of these taking place on 10 February 1946 from Blackpool's other airport, Squires Gate. The fleet quickly grew, with two more Rapides added early that year and three new Airspeed Consuls joining during the summer and generally operating from Squires Gate. The last recorded flight from Stanley Park was made by LAC's original Rapide, G-AHGD, on 21 September.

These aircraft were in great demand during the Blackpool holiday season for pleasure flights and charters to the Isle of Man, but were also used for charters further afield. For example one Rapide, G-AHAG, performed charters to Oslo and Southern Rhodesia (now Zimbabwe).

LAC incorporated single-engined Percival Proctors and Auster V light aircraft into the fleet, used for pleasure and charter flights along with army cooperation flying, often as targets for anti-aircraft gunnery and radar training.

Charter
In September 1946 LAC took a big step with the purchase of five Handley Page Halifax C.8 four-engined military transport aircraft from the RAF. These were civilianised at LAC's new base at Bovingdon, about 25 miles north-west of London. LAC then started charter flights from Squires Gate and Bovingdon and would go on to own at least 34 of the type, including the Halton 10-seat passenger variant, until the last were retired in 1953. This number includes around 15 Halifax C.6 transports which LAC bought only for their spare parts and were never civilianised or used operationally.

Britain's first airline to link air services with coaches ("Coach-air" services) was British Amphibious Airlines. In 1932 they linked with W. Armitage and Sons (Progress buses) to bring passengers from towns in Yorkshire to Blackpool to fly onwards to the Isle of Man in the airline's Saro Cutty Sark three-passenger amphibian. Eric Rylands resurrected this idea in 1947 with Squires Gate as his hub, and it proved very successful, with up to 16 rotations per day in peak season, using the Rapides. LAC operated IT charters from Manchester to Tarbes, France, and from London Gatwick Airport. Coach-air services were also operated from Blackpool to Paris via Beauvais and to Strasbourg.

Later in his career Rylands started a similar, even more successful service linking London to Paris with Skyways Coach-Air.

Also in 1947, the company opened a new passenger terminal at Yeadon, along with engineering facilities known as Yeadon Engineering. Conversion of Halifaxes from military to civil use took place here, and these started to be used for extensive charter flights. These included a charter from Liverpool to New York via Prestwick, Iceland and Gander, and other flights included destinations such as Johannesburg, Singapore & Sydney. Particularly common were loads of spare parts for the shipping and aviation industries worldwide, perishable foods from Europe and newspaper deliveries to Ireland.

One notable Halifax operation was the airlift of milk from Belfast to England in 1948. In the previous year there had been a milk shortage in England, and flights had been arranged with Skyways to bring in supplies from Northern Ireland. Results had not been particularly good, and in August 1948 a similar scheme was organised, this time using 13 aircraft from several charter airlines, including LAC who provided two Halifax transports with more success, partly due to better weather, and better facilities such as improved approach radar and more air traffic controllers at the destinations, Blackpool and Liverpool's Speke Airport. Each Halifax could carry 110 churns of milk, each of which had to be manually loaded and unloaded. The operation involved a total of around 65 rotations per day, but because demand was decreasing, it was stopped in mid-October. There was a second reason for stopping, which was that the aircraft were needed for the Berlin Airlift.

Berlin Airlift
While the large majority of Berlin Airlift operations were conducted by the US and British military, British civil charter operators played an important role, and on 27 July 1948 Flight Refuelling Ltd flew the first civilian flight of the campaign, carrying petrol to Berlin from England in a tanker conversion of the Avro Lancastrian, with their subsequent operations based at Bückeburg, Lower Saxony.

Lancashire Aircraft Corporation was contracted to operate Halton aircraft from RAF Schleswigland in Schleswig-Holstein, north-western Germany, where the Luftwaffe had installed a fixed underground fuelling system which the British Army modified to allow speedy loading of fuel for faster turnarounds. LAC and Samlesbury Engineering started converting Halifax and Halton transports into tankers at Squires Gate, Yeadon and Bovingdon, installing fuel tanks in the fuselage or bomb bay.

LAC's first Airlift flight was on 24 November 1948 and it had up to 12 Haltons based at Schleswigland, many of which were converted as tankers, along with engineering and operations staff.

It was said that "By early 1949 every motor vehicle in West Berlin was running on fuel flown in by British civilian pilots, and for that alone they deserve great credit.” Most of the civilian staff were RAF personnel decommissioned after WWII, and the aircrew had considerable prior experience of flying heavy aircraft to Berlin.

The Russians lifted the Blockade on 12 May 1949, and the airlift wound down, with the last civilian flight on 16 August. LAC had performed 2,760 sorties, second only to Flight Refuelling Ltd with 4,438, and closely followed by Skyways with 2,749. LAC lost four aircraft in crashes and six of their employees were killed during Airlift operations. (See Accidents & incidents below.)

After this the Halifax/Halton fleet was gently run down and the last examples were sold or scrapped by 1954.

A notable Halifax in the LAC fleet was C.8 G-AKEC. Named Air Voyager, this was one of the aircraft used for the milk airlift, and completed 159 sorties during the Berlin Airlift. In 1949 it appeared in the British film Stop Press Girl and operated a regular nightly newspaper run between Manchester and Belfast in 1950. In the same year it took part in the Daily Express International Air Race from Bournemouth Hurn Airport to Herne Bay pier. It came 24th in a field of 75. It was written off while parked at Squires Gate when a storm blew it into LAC Halton G-AHDV on 17 December 1952. (See Accidents & incidents below.)

Scheduled operations
After WWII, all British domestic scheduled routes were nationalised and made the responsibility of BEA. It operated scheduled flights from Manchester and Yeadon via Blackpool to the Isle of Man. Having struggled to make these routes profitable, in 1948 they authorised LAC to take them over. LAC used Rapides and Consuls on the routes in cooperation with North West Airlines, with whom they shared the Isle of Man route, and took over several more, including London (Northolt), Birmingham (Elmdon) and Jersey in its network.

Routes Summer 1952
From timetable issued April 1952 (in association with BEA)

Blackpool (Squires Gate) – IoM (Ronaldsway) (Fri Sat Sun 5 per day)
Leeds/Bradford – IoM (Fri, Sun 1 per day. Sat 2 per day, IoM – Leeds/Bradford Fri, Sat 1 per day, Sun 2 per day)
Leeds/Bradford – Jersey (Fri Sat Sun 1 per day)
Birmingham (Elmdon) – IoM (Fri Sat Sun 1 per day)

Routes Summer 1956
From timetable issued May 1956

Blackpool (Squires Gate) – IoM (Ronaldsway) (daily up to 9 per day, Mon-Thu 4 per day)
Blackpool – Jersey (Fri Sat Sun 1 per day)
Leeds/Bradford – IoM (Fri Sat Sun 3 per day)
Leeds/Bradford – Jersey (Fri Sat Sun 1 per day)
Birmingham (Elmdon) – IoM (Fri Sat Sun 1 per day)

Eric Rylands Ltd
On 4 March 1949 Eric Rylands formed Eric Rylands Ltd, with his wife Joyce as co-director and secretary, as a holding company, with an address in Sandgate Road, Folkestone, Kent. LAC and Samlesbury Engineering were held in the new company.

In the spring of 1951 David Brown joined Eric Rylands Ltd as chairman, also becoming chairman of LAC and Samlesbury Engineering. Brown was the owner of David Brown Tractors and of Aston Martin (hence model names starting with DB). He had established a small airfield at Crosland Moor near Huddersfield.

During 1951-52 LAC replaced their heavy-lift, long range Halifaxes and Haltons with Avro Yorks, all from BOAC, acquiring their entire fleet of around 25 examples. In 1952 LAC bought Skytravel Ltd, a small company that operated from Speke and Squires Gate during 1946-47. Most of their fleet was auctioned on 9 December 1947 and LAC had acquired two Consuls, a De Havilland DH.86 Express and a Miles Aerovan from them.

More significantly, in 1952 LAC also bought Skyways Ltd which had been ailing since the Berlin Airlift, and Eric Rylands became its managing director. Skyways' headquarters were temporarily moved to Bovingdon, later moving to Stansted. Most of LAC's Yorks were transferred to the control of this new subsidiary and painted in the Skyways livery. The remaining Yorks were used for Air Ministry charters, mainly trooping flights to the Caribbean, and for Inclusive Tour (IT) charters. The Yorks could carry up to 50 passengers, (a Halton could carry up to 12), so a full coachload could be carried on a single flight for the first time. Scheduled services now started to become less significant to LAC's operations.

At this time several states were not permitting civilian operators to land in or even overfly their territory, so many of these aircraft were anonymised by the removal of the company name and civil registration, and were issued with temporary military registrations. This was particularly true of the Suez Canal zone which saw intensive operations, especially around the 1956 Suez Crisis.

In 1952-53 LAC bought four Douglas DC-3s to bolster the scheduled and charter fleet during the steady removal of the Rapides. Most of the Proctors had left the fleet by then. In 1954 LAC set up a summer service run in association with East Yorkshire Motor Services, bringing passengers to Blackpool for their service to the Isle of Man. The return journey, "taking less than seven hours each way" cost around £5 10s (£5.50).

In 1954 Silver City Airways had left Lympne Airport and moved to its new Lydd Ferryfield Airport. Seeing an opportunity to build on his experience at Blackpool, Rylands leased Lympne and that year used the Skyways brand to establish a Coach-air service linking London and Paris by coach with the Channel crossing flown by DC-3s between Lympne and Beauvais. The operation proved very popular: in 1956 Rylands bought Lympne Airport, and in late 1958 he established Skyways Coach-Air Ltd as a separate subsidiary of Skyways.

Meanwhile, on 12 December 1956 Rylands sold Lancashire Aircraft Corporation to British Aviation Services (Britavia), the owners of Silver City Airways, but the sale did not include Skyways, the coach-air operation, or Samlesbury Engineering. Rylands himself remained a director of LAC, whose Blackpool operations, along with other Britavia airlines Manx Airlines and Dragon Airways, were merged as the Northern Division of Silver City during 1957.

Skyways itself survived until 1962, when Euravia bought it for £1, the combined airline later being renamed Britannia Airways. Skyways Coach-Air collapsed in 1971, and the remains were bought by Dan-Air the following year.

Samlesbury Engineering Ltd

After WWII Samlesbury Engineering had remained in the aviation business, occupying hangars at Samlesbury where English Electric had built 2,145 Halifaxes, and had diversified into building and rebuilding buses, including trolleybuses, and coaches – its proximity to Leyland Motors (around 10 miles) was probably a factor in this decision.

After its intense activity, especially converting, maintaining and repairing Halifaxes during the Berlin Airlift the workload decreased, and its outposts away from its home base were closed or taken over by other organisations. At Samlesbury the company had returned its main hangars to English Electric and set up in smaller premises on the other side of the airfield, previously occupied by Burnley Aircraft Products, where it continued to produce aircraft components for the Vickers Viscount for example, and had also turned to building ambulance, van and trailer bodies.

With its specialist aviation and vehicle experience, in 1954 it built the turbojet-powered Bluebird K7 hydroplane for Donald Campbell's water speed record runs.

An experiment with frameless reinforced glassfibre road haulage containers in the early 1960s apparently came to nothing. The vehicle building part of the business was separated from the aviation side and, renamed Samlesbury Engineering (1961) Ltd. was taken over by The British Trailer Co. Ltd. Around that time, the remains of Samlesbury Engineering were absorbed into BAC.

Lancashire Aircraft Company

In October 1958 Samlesbury Engineering formed a subsidiary named in memory of its parent's recently closed sibling, Lancashire Aircraft Company Ltd. The directors were Eric Rylands (chairman), Sir Wavell Wakefield and David Gaunt.

Lancashire Aircraft Company had been created to continue the development and production of the Edgar Percival EP.9 utility aircraft, which had been bought from Edgar Percival himself. In addition to the rights to the design, the sale included two complete aircraft, seven unfinished airframes and the production jigs from Percival's factory at Stapleford Aerodrome in Essex.

At first the operation was set up at Squires Gate, but in 1960 it was moved to Samlesbury Aerodrome.

The company developed the design, replacing the EP.9's  Lycoming engine with a  version and three-bladed propeller, and named it the Lancashire Aircraft Prospector. Only five airframes were completed, plus a single example of a Mk.2 version with a  Armstrong Siddeley Cheetah X radial engine, which first flew in August 1960. Some say that the Mk.2 was only produced to allow the aircraft to attend that year's SBAC Farnborough Airshow, because the Mk.I would have been disqualified for having a foreign (American) engine.

A Prospector was displayed alongside a Skyways Coach-Air Avro 748 at the 1963 Biggin Hill Air Fair.

No further orders were forthcoming, and production stopped in 1961. In 1963 Lancashire Aircraft Company moved to Ryland's airport at Lympne, where it ran a small maintenance and repair operation specialising in the Prospectors but it had closed down completely by 1964.

Prospector production list
Percival's construction numbers started at 20. C/n 41 onwards were completed by Lancashire Aircraft Company.

Fleet

Aircraft registered to Lancashire Aircraft Corporation

Livery was pale green overall with red trim and lettering.

Aircraft registered to Eric Rylands Ltd.

Accidents and incidents
 On 5 June 1947 LAC Halifax C.8 G-AIHW made a very hard night landing at London Heathrow Airport after a flight carrying six tons of apricots from Valencia, Spain. The fuselage was buckled and the aircraft written off. There were no casualties.
 On 5 December 1947 LAC Halifax C.8 G-AIHU crashed into high ground near Rhyl, Denbighshire, on a cargo flight from Lille, France, to Liverpool Speke Airport. All four crew were killed.
 On 3 September 1948 LAC Halifax C.8 G-AIHX overran the runway on landing at Squires Gate after a cargo flight from Bovingdon. The aircraft was written off but there were no injuries among the three crew.
 On 15 January 1949 three LAC ground engineers and their German driver were killed at Schleswigland in a ground vehicle which was in collision with RAF Handley Page Hastings C.1 TG521.
 On 21 March 1949 LAC Halifax C.8 G-AJZZ flew a too low approach and crashed short of the runway at Schleswigland, Germany after a cargo flight from Berlin Tempelhof Airport. Three crew were killed and one injured.
 On 1 June 1949 Halifax C.8 G-AKBJ was written off after an unexplained crash at Berlin Tegel Airport after a cargo flight from Schleswigland. All four crew suffered slight injuries.
 On 12 June 1949 LAC Halton G-ALBZ suffered a burst tyre on landing at Tegel after a cargo flight from Schleswigland. The pilot lost control and the aircraft collided with parked LAC Halifax C8 G-AHWN. The Halton was written off but there were no casualties. The Halifax was repaired. (See entry below.)
 On 6 July 1949 LAC Halifax C.8 G-AHWN was written off at Schleswigland when the undercarriage failed to retract after takeoff and then collapsed on landing on its return. None of the three crew were injured.
 On 18 August 1949 LAC Percival Proctor 4 G-AKLC on a test flight from Yeadon crashed near Shipley, West Yorkshire, when the wing failed after modification. All four occupants were killed, one of whom was a son of Eric Rylands.
 On 28 December 1949 LAC Halifax C.8 G-AIHY was damaged beyond repair in a taxiing accident at Paris–Le Bourget Airport. No casualties.
 On 25 October 1950 LAC Airspeed Consul G-AJLH was withdrawn from use after an undercarriage collapse on landing at Seaton Carew, West Hartlepool, County Durham. Neither occupant was injured.
 On 8 March 1951 LAC Halifax C.8 G-AJZY crashed on approach to RAF Bovingdon after a flight from Torslanda Airport, Gothenburg, with a cargo of frozen reindeer carcases. All four crew were killed. Icing may have been the cause.
 On 10 April 1951 an engine fell off LAC Halton 2 G-AGZP while flying near Buntingford, Hertfordshire. It safely made an emergency landing at Stansted Airport and was not repaired, being scrapped in 1952.
 On 17 December 1952 LAC Halton G-AHDV and Halifax C.8 G-AKEC were written off at Squires Gate when strong winds blew 'EC into 'DV while they were both parked. No one was hurt.
 On 14 September 1956 LAC Dragon Rapide G-ALEJ was damaged beyond repair during a flight from Blackpool when thick smoke in the cockpit forced an emergency landing in a field in Eccleshall, Staffordshire. The pilot and the six passengers were unhurt.

See also
 List of defunct airlines of the United Kingdom

Footnotes

References

Defunct airlines of the United Kingdom